Kannarun Wongkajornklai (born 5 April 1991) is a Thai actress who signed a contract as an actor under Broadcast Thai Television from 2010 to 2021, currently turning into a freelance actor. Famous for playing Mae Ying Chan Wad in the historical period drama Love Destiny.

Early life and career 
Kannaran, nicknamed Prang, was born on April 5, 1991, is the middle child among 3 siblings who graduated primary and secondary from Sarasas Witaed Bangbon School and a bachelor's degree from  international college Mahidol University field of Tourism and Hospitality Management with first class honors, GPA 3.78.

She entered the industry from the contest Miss Teen Thailand 2007 by making it to the final 15 finalists and then had her first work in the industry, which was to star in the movie, Incidentally, miss you very much (อนึ่ง คิดถึงเป็นอย่างยิ่ง) in 2009 by receiving the role as Jaeng, and later came in to sign a contract with Broadcast Thai Television Company, by the first performance was the youth series reflects on society, Nong Mai Rhai Borisut, playing the role of Lin in 2010–2012 and has continued to work.

Until decided not to renew the contract and the contract with Broadcast Thai Television Company expired in 2021. Her first performance as a freelance actor was the drama "Fah Pieng Din" on One 31 channel, starring with Thanaphat Kawila.

Personal life 
Kannaran was in a relationship with Tong Pitawat Pruksakit, a famous rapper known as Tong Twopee, but broke up in 2019 before dating again in 2021 until  Tong Pitawat decided to kneel and ask Kannaran to marry at The Edge, a top of the Hudson Yards building in central New York City while Tong Pitawat was traveling to perform a concert by Nana Rybena and Way Thaitanium, who are seniors in Tong's rapper industry, were witnesses. but now both of them have broken up.

Filmography

Television dramas
 2013 Paen Rai Phai Ruk (แผนร้ายพ่ายรัก) (Master One VDO Production/Ch.3) as Pisa (พิศา)   
 2013 Dao Kaew Duen (ดาวเกี้ยวเดือน) (Broadcast Thai​ Television/Ch.3) as Khun Ying Nim (หม่อมราชวงศ์หญิงนิมมานรดี นพรัตน์ (คุณหญิงนิ่ม)) with Kong Karoon Sosothikul
 2014 Phope Ruk (ภพรัก) (เมตตาและมหานิยม/Ch.3) as Buran (Naan) (ร้อยตำรวจตรีหญิง บุหรัน (หมวดแนน)) 
 2015 Bang Rajan (บางระจัน) (Broadcast Thai​ Television/Ch.3) as Feung (เฟื่อง) with Phet Thakrit Hamannopjit
 2016 Payak Rai Ruk Puan (สายลับรักป่วน) (Mindsatworktv Co.,Ltd./Ch.3) as Tan (แตน) with Golf Pichaya Nitipaisankul
 2017 Buang Banjathorn (บ่วงบรรจถรณ์) (Broadcast Thai​ Television/Ch.3) as Thongriew (เจ้านางตองริ้ว สุวรรณศักดิ์) with Nattawin Wattanagitiphat
 2018 Love Destiny (บุพเพสันนิวาส) (Broadcast Thai​ Television/Ch.3) as Lady Chanwat, daughter of Lek and Nim (แม่หญิงจันทร์วาด) with Parama Imanothai
 2018 Nak Soo Taywada (นักสู้เทวดา) (Step Power Three/Ch.3) as Hataya (หทยา เทพารักษ์ (ญา)) with Parama Imanothai
 2020 Fah Fak Ruk (ฟ้าฝากรัก) (Broadcast Thai Television/Ch.3) as Yoga Instructor (พิธีกรรายการ VOGA enternity) (Cameo)
 2020 Mia Archeep (เมียอาชีพ) (Step Power Three/Ch.3) as Chollada (Dao) (ชลลดา (ดาว)) with Mai Warit Sirisantana
 2021 Duang Jai Nai Montra (ดวงใจในมนตรา) (Broadcast Thai​ Television/Ch.3) as Wasita (Wanda) (วาสิตา (แวนด้า)) with Peter Corp Dyrendal
 2021 Khun Pee Chuay Duay (Help Me คุณผีช่วยด้วย) (TV Scene & Picture/Ch.3) as Arnong (Nong) (อนงค์ (นงค์)) with Chantavit Dhanasevi & Weerakhan Kanwattanakun
 2022 Fah Pieng Din (2022) (ฟ้าเพียงดิน) (The One Enterprise/One 31) as Chompoo / Sarika Sarayuttapichai (ชมพู่ / สาลิกา สรายุทธพิชัย) with Thanapat Kawila 
 2022 Sai Lub Lip Gloss (สายลับลิปกลอส) (Broadcast Thai​ Television/Ch.3) as Yadpirun Khanjanawithoo (Pon) (หยาดพิรุณ กาญจนวิธู (ฝน)) with Parama Imanothai
 20 Love Destiny 2 (พรหมลิขิต) (Broadcast Thai​ Television/Ch.3) as Lady Chanwat, daughter of Lek and Nim (แม่หญิงจันทร์วาด) with Parama Imanothai

Television series
 2010 - 2012 Nong Mai Rai Borisut (น้องใหม่ร้ายบริสุทธิ์) (Broadcast Thai​ Television/Ch.3) as Lin (หลิน)
 2015  (บันทึกกรรม ตอน เงื่อน/ตาย) (Mindsatworktv/Ch.3) as Aorapreeya (อรปรียา)
 2016  (บันทึกกรรม ตอน เสน่ห์ยาแฝด) (Mindsatworktv/Ch.3) as Nida (นิดา)
 2017 The Cupids Series Part 7 : Kammathep Jum Laeng (บริษัทรักอุตลุด เรื่อง กามเทพจำแลง) (Broadcast Thai​ Television/Ch.3) as Prima (พริมา) with Teeradetch Metawarayut

Television sitcom

Film
 2009 Miss You Again (2009) (อนึ่ง คิดถึงเป็นอย่างยิ่ง) (Five Star Production) as Jang (แจง) 
 2021 Haunted Tales (2021) (เรื่อง ผี เล่า ตอน ไปผุดไปเกิด) (M39) as Thiwa (ทิวา) with Arak Amornsupasiri & Prin Suparat

Music video appearance
 2020 Ham (ห้าม) Ost.Mia Archeep - Wan Wanwan (Chandelier Music/YouTube:Ch3Thailand Music)  
 2022 Par Ter (แพ้เธอ) Ost.Fah Pieng Din - ภูมิ แก้วฟ้าเจริญ (The One Enterprise/YouTube:one31) with Film Thanapat Kawila

MC
 Online 
 2020 : ไปกับแม๊ EP. 1 On Air YouTube:Ladiiprang

References 

Living people
1991 births
Kannarun Wongkajornklai
Kannarun Wongkajornklai
Kannarun Wongkajornklai
Kannarun Wongkajornklai
Kannarun Wongkajornklai
Kannarun Wongkajornklai
Kannarun Wongkajornklai
Kannarun Wongkajornklai
Kannarun Wongkajornklai